Mandala: A Novel of India is a novel written by Pearl S. Buck in 1970.

Centering her story around a princely family of the New India, Buck explores the mysticism that pervades everyday life there. It is unusual among this author's novels, which are most often set in China or the U.S.

References

1970 American novels
Novels by Pearl S. Buck
Novels set in India
Interculturalism
John Day Company books
Sino-Indian War in fiction